Ivan Timofeevich Artemyev (7(19) August  1895, Lobkovo, Ryazan Province, - October 18, 1968, Moscow) was a Russian football player involved in the founding of FC Spartak Moscow.

Artemyev was living in Presnya, a district of Moscow, at the time of the Russian Revolution. He soon played a leading role in organising sporting activity in what was one of the most ardently revolutionary districts of Moscow. The Moscow Sports Circle was formed in 1921, and by 1922 had opened a stadium on a former potato field.

References

1895 births
1968 deaths